Alain Ledoux (9 October 1952 - 16 October 2008) was a Belgian table tennis player who competed in Paralympic Games where he won three bronze medals. He is the father of fellow table tennis player Marc Ledoux.

Paralympic Games

He competed for the first time in the Los Angeles 1984 Paralympics Games where he won a bronze medal. He won another medal four years later in Seoul 1988. He also took part in Barcelona 1992. He competed for the last time in Atlanta 1996 where he won the third bronze medal of his sport career.

He joined Athens 2004 and Beijing 2008 as a personal coach.

External links
Results

1952 births
Belgian male table tennis players
Table tennis players at the 1984 Summer Paralympics
Table tennis players at the 1988 Summer Paralympics
Table tennis players at the 1992 Summer Paralympics
Table tennis players at the 1996 Summer Paralympics
Paralympic table tennis players of Belgium
Medalists at the 1984 Summer Paralympics
Medalists at the 1988 Summer Paralympics
Medalists at the 1996 Summer Paralympics
Paralympic medalists in table tennis
Paralympic bronze medalists for Belgium
2008 deaths